Cándido Saúl Ramírez Montes (born 5 June 1993) is a Mexican professional footballer who plays as a winger.

Club career
Ramírez began his career with Liga MX club Santos Laguna. In the Apertura 2013 he was loaned to UNAM. After an unsuccessful season he was loaned to C.F. Monterrey for the Clausura 2014. On 8 June 2016, Atlas made it official that Ramírez would join the club on loan for the Apertura 2016.

International career
With two goals in the 2012 Toulon Tournament, Ramírez helped Mexico win the Tournament.

Under-23 international goals

U-23 International appearances
As of 1 June 2012

Honours
Santos Laguna
Mexican Primera División: Clausura 2012

Mexico U23
Toulon Tournament: 2012

Individual
Toulon Tournament Best Goal: 2012

References

External links
 
 
 

Mexico international footballers
Footballers from Guanajuato
Sportspeople from León, Guanajuato
Santos Laguna footballers
Club Universidad Nacional footballers
C.F. Monterrey players
Atlas F.C. footballers
Atlético Morelia players
1993 births
Living people
Liga MX players
Mexican footballers
Association football midfielders